Trichotropis conica is a species of small sea snail, a marine gastropod mollusk in the family Capulidae, the cap snails.

Description

Distribution
This marine species occurs off Greenland and Northern Canada.

References

 Turgeon, D.; Quinn, J.F.; Bogan, A.E.; Coan, E.V.; Hochberg, F.G.; Lyons, W.G.; Mikkelsen, P.M.; Neves, R.J.; Roper, C.F.E.; Rosenberg, G.; Roth, B.; Scheltema, A.; Thompson, F.G.; Vecchione, M.; Williams, J.D. (1998). Common and scientific names of aquatic invertebrates from the United States and Canada: mollusks. 2nd ed. American Fisheries Society Special Publication, 26. American Fisheries Society: Bethesda, MD (USA). . IX, 526 + cd-rom pp
 Gosner, K. L. (1971). Guide to identification of marine and estuarine invertebrates: Cape Hatteras to the Bay of Fundy. John Wiley & Sons, Inc. 693 p
 Linkletter, L. E. (1977). A checklist of marine fauna and flora of the Bay of Fundy. Huntsman Marine Laboratory, St. Andrews, N.B. 68: p
 Backeljau, T. (1986). Lijst van de recente mariene mollusken van België [List of the recent marine molluscs of Belgium]. Koninklijk Belgisch Instituut voor Natuurwetenschappen: Brussels, Belgium. 106 pp.

External links
 Möller, H. P. C. (1842). Index Molluscorum Groenlandiae. Naturhistorisk Tidsskrift. 4: 76–97 (Copenhagen)
 Trott, T. J. (2004). Cobscook Bay inventory: a historical checklist of marine invertebrates spanning 162 years. Northeastern Naturalist. 11, 261–324

Capulidae
Gastropods described in 1842